Louis Edward "Lou" Webb (September 6, 1911 – September 2, 1940) was an American racecar driver.  Predominantly racing midgets and big cars, he was killed in a AAA-sanctioned national championship race.

Life and career
Louie Webb was born in Knoxville, Tennessee.  He and his brother Jack worked as mechanics in Glendale, California.  Webb developed an interest in motor sports when he visited Legion Ascot Speedway where he began his racing career as a riding mechanic.  Webb went on to become a driver, racing at Legion Ascot.  He would later race on the east coast with AAA, and move into AAA Championship racing.

Death
On September 2, 1940, Webb competed in a 100-mile AAA-sanctioned national championship race held at the New York State Fairgrounds in Syracuse, New York before 40,000 spectators.  On the 17th lap, he collided with Kelly Petillo, who was decreasing speed for turn one.  Webb rode over Petillo's car, hurtled into the air and somersaulted down the track.  Petillo was virtually unscathed, but Webb, who was ejected from his racer, died a little later.

References

1911 births
1940 deaths
Sportspeople from Knoxville, Tennessee
Racing drivers from Tennessee
Racing drivers from California
Mechanics (people)
Racing drivers who died while racing
Sports deaths in New York (state)